Paradise Falls is a 2013 Canadian horror comedy short film, written and directed by Fantavious Fritz. Set in a mysterious neighbourhood that was abandoned after the revelation that it was built atop an ancient cemetery and was thus apparently cursed, the film centres on Sonny (Alistair Ball) and Dirk (Uri Livene-Bar), two young boys who decide to explore the developer's mansion and encounter the ghost of his dead daughter Eleanor (Daiva Zalnieriunas).

The film features narration by Alex Crowther.

It premiered at the 2013 Toronto International Film Festival.

The film was named to TIFF's year-end Canada's Top Ten list for short films in 2013.

References

External links

2013 films
2013 short films
Canadian comedy short films
Canadian horror short films
Canadian comedy horror films
English-language Canadian films
Films directed by Graham Foy
2010s English-language films
2010s Canadian films